The Volp is a  river of southwestern France. It is a right tributary of the Garonne, which it joins upstream of Cazères, Haute-Garonne.  A flood in 1993 ruined a marginal amount of cropland.

In 1912 ice-age cave paintings were discovered in a cave along the length of the Volp. See Trois Frères.

Notable places along the river include:
 Ariège: Sainte-Croix-Volvestre
 Haute-Garonne: Le Plan

References

Rivers of France
Rivers of Ariège (department)
Rivers of Haute-Garonne
Rivers of Occitania (administrative region)